Hugh John Simpson Gibson MBE (born 10 August 1946) is a Democratic Unionist Party (DUP) politician in Northern Ireland who was a Member of the Legislative Assembly (MLA) for Strangford from 2010 to 2011.

Gibson studied at Saintfield Secondary School and Shaftesbury House Tutorial College, before working as a farmer and becoming a member of the Orange Order. He joined the Democratic Unionist Party (DUP) and was elected to Ards Borough Council in 1981. He held his seat until he stood down in 1997, serving as Mayor of Ards in 1987-88.

At the 1982 Northern Ireland Assembly election, Gibson was elected in North Down.  He contested Strangford at the 1983 general election, taking second place, with 30% of the votes cast.  In the mid-1990s, he served as Vice-Chairman of the DUP.
In August 2010, Gibson was appointed to the Northern Ireland Assembly as the replacement for Jim Shannon. He did not stand in the 2011 Assembly election in which the DUP held three of its four seats, losing Gibson's to the Ulster Unionist Party.

Gibson was appointed Member of the Order of the British Empire (MBE) in the 2015 New Year Honours for political service to the DUP and services to the community in Northern Ireland.

References

External links
 NIA profile

1946 births
Living people
Democratic Unionist Party politicians
Members of Ards Borough Council
Mayors of places in Northern Ireland
Northern Ireland MPAs 1982–1986
Northern Ireland MLAs 2007–2011
Members of the Order of the British Empire